The Barton Mystery is a 1932 British crime film directed by Henry Edwards and starring Ursula Jeans, Ellis Jeffreys and Lyn Harding. It was based on the play The Barton Mystery by Walter C. Hackett.

It was made at British and Dominions Studios, Elstree, as a second feature for release by Paramount Pictures. At the time Paramount was spending more on its quota films than other Hollywood companies.

Cast
 Ursula Jeans as Ethel Standish 
 Ellis Jeffreys as Lady Marshall 
 Lyn Harding as Beverly 
 Ion Swinley as Richard Standish 
 Wendy Barrie as Phyllis Grey 
 Joyce Bland as Helen Barton 
 Tom Helmore as Harry Maitland 
 O. B. Clarence as Sir Everard Marshall 
 Franklyn Bellamy as Gerald Barton 
 Wilfred Noy as Griffiths

References

Bibliography
 Chibnall, Steve. Quota Quickies: The Birth of the British 'B' Film. British Film Institute, 2007.

External links

1932 films
British crime films
1932 crime films
Films directed by Henry Edwards
Quota quickies
British black-and-white films
Sound film remakes of silent films
Remakes of British films
British and Dominions Studios films
Films shot at Imperial Studios, Elstree
1930s English-language films
1930s British films